The Rodrigues blue pigeon (Alectroenas payandeei) is an extinct species of blue pigeon which was endemic to Rodrigues. It is known only from the holotype tarsometatarsus collected in 2005, associated with remains of a Rodrigues night heron and a Rodrigues rail. A femur described in 1879 but now lost may also have belonged to the species. It was not specifically mentioned by contemporary writers, and it is therefore unknown when it became extinct.

References

Fauna of Rodrigues
Extinct birds of Indian Ocean islands
Alectroenas
Birds described in 2011